This is a list of protests held in Wisconsin, related to the murder of George Floyd, during 2020. Additional protests occurred in late August in Kenosha, Wisconsin in the aftermath of the shooting of Jacob Blake and Alvin Cole.

Locations

Appleton 
Over one thousand people gathered in downtown Appleton on May 30 and 31 for a peaceful protest down College Avenue to Houdini Plaza and the Appleton Police Department.

Eau Claire 
Hundreds marched from Phoenix Park to Owen Park through downtown Eau Claire on May 31. On June 5 another rally was held in Phoenix Park followed by a march of reportedly thousands through the streets of downtown Eau Claire.

Franklin 
Over two hundred protestors marched through the city and held a peaceful rally on June 11, starting at the Franklin library.

Green Bay 
On the evening of May 30 and the afternoon of May 31, there were peaceful protests held in downtown Green Bay. However, on the evening of the 31st, a Marathon gas station was looted, and several shots were fired. The police began firing rubber pellets at the protesters, at which point, the crowd began throwing rocks at the police. Police dispersed the crowd with gas. On June 7, an estimated 1,000–2,500 people showed up to march across the Walnut Street Bridge and protest police brutality after the murder of George Floyd, making it the largest protest in recent Green Bay history. The crowds were so big that the intended path for the protest, walking from Leicht Memorial Park to the Green Bay Police Department, needed to be scrapped.  Organizers stated that activists from groups that were not previously familiar with one another united as a form of grieving and solidarity in the hope to achieve wide-scale police reform. The protest was completely peaceful, with no arrests or incidents of looting and vandalism reported. Activists later took to City Hall looking to remove a curfew put in by Green Bay police, mayor Eric Genrich and the majority of city council members; the curfew was set to curb looting and vandalism that had occurred at times from previous protests.

Kenosha 

Between 100 and 125 demonstrators peacefully marched through downtown Kenosha on May 31. Members of the City Council supported the peaceful protests while condemning the violent ones in Milwaukee. After the shooting of Jacob Blake on August 23, further protests broke out in Kenosha which resulted in 2 protesters being shot and killed.

La Crosse 
On the evening of May 29 and 30, 2020, there were peaceful protests held in downtown La Crosse. June 3: Nearly 700 protesters marched from Riverside Park and to City Hall. Demonstrators kneeled for nine minutes and speakers talked about their own local experiences of racism. In response the La Crosse Police Department launched a "transparency tab" on their website to better inform the public on how they operate.

Madison 
On May 30, there was a peaceful demonstration at the State Capitol with around 1,000 attendees. As the evening progressed, it evolved into a riot with some storefronts on State Street being damaged, and a conflict with police that was met with tear gas. A neighborhood curfew was declared by Mayor Satya Rhodes-Conway.

On June 23, in response to the arrest of activist Devonere Johnson, who had caused a disturbance in a restaurant with a baseball bat and a bullhorn, around 300 protesters blocked traffic, caused damage to several buildings, and toppled two statues. State Senator Tim Carpenter was also attacked by protesters.

Marinette 
On the early afternoon of June 3, a peaceful protest was held on Stephenson Island, which is on the state line between Wisconsin and Michigan and alongside US HWY 41. Close to 100 protestors attended. Some local businesses were boarded up and closed for the day, and another business had volunteer personnel in army camouflage, armed with semi-automatic rifles standing-by. Many drove by flipping the bird and swearing at protestors but no violence erupted.

Milwaukee 
On May 29, hundreds of protesters in Milwaukee blocked highways and organized a vehicle procession that traveled several miles. There were reports of looting and mild arson at a Walgreens pharmacy, as well as the looting of a Boost Mobile store. Several other businesses were damaged. In addition, one police officer was mildly injured by gunfire. Protests over the killing of Joel Acevedo by an off-duty Milwaukee police officer were prompted by the George Floyd protests.

On June 2, protesters gathered at Humboldt Park and marched to the south side of Milwaukee, where they demonstrated outside City Hall and Milwaukee Police District 1. Police used tear gas on protesters and reports were made that Molotov cocktails were thrown at officers. Protesters on the Hoan Bridge walked off into traffic, where protest organizer Frank Nitty was apprehended and beaten by police. On June 7, members of the Milwaukee Bucks, including players, coaches, staff and ownership, participated in a rally in honor of George Floyd. Bucks star Sterling Brown led the march, where he held a nine-second moment of silence for Floyd and shared his experiences with police brutality. On June 9, protesters again gathered at Humboldt Park to demonstrate against racism and police brutality.

Racine 
Protests on May 31 ended with vandalism, burglaries, and police using tear gas. Protests the day after ended peacefully with over 200 protesters.

Sheboygan 
Over a hundred people gathered in downtown Sheboygan on June 2.

Shorewood 

On , thousands of people protested peacefully in a march from Shorewood to Whitefish Bay and back.  Hand sanitizer, masks, snacks, and bottles of water were handed out by volunteers.  Residents along the route showed their support by standing in their yards holding up signs.

A 64-year-old white probate lawyer interrupted the protest by parking in the middle of the street and then spat on a 17-year-old black high school student.  The spitter was arrested and faced both "charges of battery and disorderly conduct" and "a professional misconduct complaint as a lawyer".  The following day, the spitter confronted protesters outside her house, and police arrived at her home to arrest her.  Resisting arrest, the spitter kneed one of the officers in the groin, and faced "additional charges of battery of a law enforcement officer and resisting arrest".

Wausau 
On the afternoon of May 29, approximately 150 to 200 people participated in a protest near the Marathon County Courthouse in downtown Wausau.

References 

2020 in Wisconsin
Wisconsin
Riots and civil disorder in Wisconsin
May 2020 events in the United States
June 2020 events in the United States
Protests in Wisconsin